Melissa King may refer to:

 Melissa King (chef) (born 1983), chef and contestant on Top Chef
 Melissa King, contestant of Miss Delaware Teen USA